Kuu Kuu Harajuku (originally titled KooKoo Harajuku) is an animated children's television series created by Gwen Stefani for Network Ten, based on her Harajuku Lovers brand. The series debuted on Eleven in Australia on November 1, 2015.

Series overview

Episodes

Season 1 (2015–16)

Season 2 (2017)

Season 3 (2018–19)

Notes

References

Lists of Australian animated television series episodes
Lists of Malaysian animated television series episodes
Lists of American children's animated television series episodes
Lists of Canadian children's animated television series episodes